Portland Gallery is an art gallery in central London, England.

Founded in 1984 by Tom Hewlett, the gallery displays modern British and Contemporary paintings. A particular specialization is the work of Scottish colourists Samuel Peploe, Francis Cadell, George Leslie Hunter, and John Duncan Fergusson, and their immediate followers, including Anne Redpath and John Maclauchlan Milne. The gallery also hosts the estate collections of Cadell, Maclauchlan Milne, and Edward Seago.

Among contemporary painters and sculptors, the gallery has displayed works by Archie Forrest, Gary Bunt, Paul Rafferty, Nicholas Hely Hutchinson, Gordon Mitchell, Oliver Akers Douglas, and David Spiller.

The gallery exhibits at the London Art Fair. It is located at 3 Bennet Street in London, close to The Ritz Hotel.

References

External links 
 Portland Gallery website
 'The Missing Colourist'

1984 establishments in England
Art galleries established in 1984
Art galleries in London
Contemporary art galleries in London
Buildings and structures in the City of Westminster
Tourist attractions in the City of Westminster
British art